Pelargonic acid, also called nonanoic acid, is an organic compound with structural formula . It is a nine-carbon fatty acid.  Nonanoic acid is a colorless oily liquid with an unpleasant, rancid odor. It is nearly insoluble in water, but very soluble in organic solvents.  The esters and salts of pelargonic acid are called pelargonates or nonanoates.

The acid is named after the pelargonium plant, since oil from its leaves contains esters of the acid.

Preparation
Together with azelaic acid, it is produced industrially by ozonolysis of oleic acid.

Alternatively, pelargonic acid can be produced in a two-step process beginning with coupled dimerization and hydroesterification of 1,3-butadiene. This step produces a doubly unsaturated C9-ester, which can be hydrogenated to give esters of pelargonic acid.

\overset{1,3-butadiene}{2CH2=CH-CH=CH2}{} + CO + CH3OH -> CH2=CH(CH2)3CH=CHCH2CO2CH3
CH2=CH(CH2)3CH=CHCH2CO2CH3{} + 2 H2 -> \underset{pelargonic\ acid\ ester}{CH3(CH2)7CO2CH3}

A laboratory preparation involves permanganate oxidation of 1-decene.

Occurrence, and uses
Pelargonic acid occurs naturally as esters in the oil of pelargonium. 

Synthetic esters of pelargonic acid, such as methyl pelargonate, are used as flavorings. Pelargonic acid is also used in the preparation of plasticizers and lacquers. The derivative 4-nonanoylmorpholine is an ingredient in some pepper sprays. The ammonium salt of pelargonic acid, ammonium pelargonate, is a herbicide. It is commonly used in conjunction with glyphosate, a non-selective herbicide, for a quick burn-down effect in the control of weeds in turfgrass.

The methyl form and ethylene glycol pelargonate act as nematicides against Meloidogyne javanica on Solanum lycopersicum, and the methyl against Heterodera glycines and M. incognita on Glycine max.

Esters of pelargonic acid are precursors to lubricants.

Pharmacological effects
Pelargonic acid may be more potent than valproic acid in treating seizures. Moreover, in contrast to valproic acid, pelargonic acid exhibited no effect on HDAC inhibition, suggesting that it is unlikely to show HDAC inhibition-related teratogenicity.

See also
 List of saturated fatty acids
 List of carboxylic acids

References

External links
MSDS at affymetrix.com

Alkanoic acids
Herbicides
Nematicides